Humberto Domingo Mayans Canabal (born 6 February 1949) is a Mexican politician affiliated with the Institutional Revolutionary Party. He currently serves as Senator of the LXII Legislature of the Mexican Congress representing Tabasco. He also served as Senator between 1994 and 2000 and as Deputy between 2000 and 2003.

References

1949 births
Living people
Politicians from Tabasco
Members of the Senate of the Republic (Mexico)
Members of the Chamber of Deputies (Mexico)
Institutional Revolutionary Party politicians
20th-century Mexican politicians
21st-century Mexican politicians
National Autonomous University of Mexico alumni
People from Villahermosa